A justice ministry, ministry of justice, or department of justice is a ministry or other government agency in charge of the administration of justice. The ministry or department is often headed by a minister of justice (minister for justice in a very few countries) or a secretary of justice. In some countries, the head of the department may be called the attorney general, for example in the United States. Monaco is an example of a country that does not have a ministry of justice, but rather a Directorate of Judicial Services (head: Secretary of Justice) that oversees the administration of justice. Vatican City, a country under the sovereignty of the Holy See, also does not possess a ministry of justice. Instead, the Governorate of Vatican City State (head: President of the Governorate of Vatican City State), the legislative body of the Vatican, includes a legal office.

Depending on the country, specific duties may relate to organizing the justice system, overseeing the public prosecutor and national investigative agencies (e.g. the American Federal Bureau of Investigation), and maintaining the legal system and public order. Some ministries have additional responsibilities in related policy areas such as overseeing elections, directing the police, law reform, and administration of the immigration and citizenship services. The duties of the ministry of justice may in some countries be split from separate responsibilities of an attorney general (often responsible for the justice system) and the interior minister (often responsible for public order). Sometimes the prison system is separated into another government department called Corrective Services.

Related articles and lists

† Based on available research, these are the countries, states or territories that have yet to appoint a female as the Minister of Justice, Attorney General or equivalent.

Historical 
Ministry of Justice (imperial China): A Chinese government ministry between the Sui and Qing dynasties
Ministry of Justice (pre-modern Japan): A Japanese government ministry between the Asuka and Meiji periods
Ministry of Justice (Soviet Union): A government ministry of the USSR that existed from 1923 to 1991
Ministry of Justice (Yugoslavia): The justice ministry that was responsible for the judicial system of the following: Kingdom of Yugoslavia (1918-1945), SFR Yugoslavia (1945-1992), and FR Yugoslavia period (1992–2003)

Sub-national ministries and departments
 Attorney-General's Department (Australia)
 Department of Justice and Regulation (Victoria)
 Department of Justice and Public Administration (Basque Country)
 Department of Justice (Canada)
 State of Hawaii Department of the Attorney General
 Department of Justice (Hong Kong)
 Department of Justice (Ireland)
 Department of Justice (Kenya)
 Department of Justice and Public Safety (New Brunswick)
 Department of Justice (New South Wales)
 Department of Justice (Northern Ireland)
 Department of Justice and Attorney-General (Queensland)
 Department of Justice and Constitutional Development (South Africa)
 Department of Justice of the Generalitat de Catalunya (Catalonia)
 Department of Justice and Attorney General (New Brunswick)
 Department of Justice and Consumer Affairs (New Brunswick)

See also 

Attorney general
Interior minister
List of female justice ministers
List of first women lawyers and judges by nationality

References 

 
Justice